Donald Wayne Baldwin (born July 9, 1964) is a former American football defensive end who played for the New York Jets of the National Football League as well as the Toronto Argonauts and the Ottawa Rough Riders of the Canadian Football League. He played college football at Purdue.

College football career 
Baldwin played for the Purdue Boilermakers football team from 1982 to 1985.

Professional football career

New York Jets 

Baldwin played eight games with the New York Jets in 1987, as a defensive tackle.

The 1987 NFL season was affected by a strike for four weeks, with Week 3 games not being played and Weeks 4–6 games being played using replacement players. However, some players chose to "cross the picket line" and play during the strike anyway. Baldwin crossed the picket line for the Week 6 game, a matchup against the Miami Dolphins which the Jets won 37–31.

Toronto Argonauts

1988 season 

Baldwin played five games with the Toronto Argonauts in 1988, his most prolific season in the Canadian Football League. He made five tackles, five sacks, and one interception, as well as recovered two of the opposing team's fumbles.

1989 season 

Baldwin only played two games with the Argonauts in 1989 before switching teams.

Ottawa Rough Riders 

At some point during the 1989 season, Baldwin joined the Ottawa Rough Riders. He played three games with the team that season.

References 

Living people

1964 births
American football defensive ends
Canadian football defensive linemen
New York Jets players
Ottawa Rough Riders players
People from St. Charles, Missouri
Players of American football from Missouri
Players of Canadian football from Missouri
Purdue Boilermakers football players
Toronto Argonauts players